Duke of Addis Abeba (Italian: Duca di Addis Abeba) is a hereditary  title in the Italian nobility which was bestowed at the Italian conquest of Ethiopia as a victory title by King Victor Emmanuel III for Marshal Pietro Badoglio after he led Italian troops into Addis Ababa on May 5, 1936. 

On the May 5, 1936, Benito Mussolini declared King Victor Emmanuel III of Italy the new Emperor of Ethiopia and Ethiopia an Italian province. On the same occasion, Marshal Pietro Badoglio was appointed the first Viceroy of Ethiopia and made "Duke of Addis Abeba" by the King.

List of dukes of Addis Abeba
Pietro Badoglio, 1st Duke of Addis Abeba (1871–1956).
Pietro Badoglio, 2nd Duke of Addis Abeba (1939–1992).
Flavio Badoglio, 3rd Duke of Addis Abeba (born 1973) grandson of 2nd Duke

Dukes of Italy
Italian East Africa
1936 establishments in Italy
Dukes Addis Ababa
Noble titles created in 1936